A royal warrant is a document issued by a monarch which confers rights or privileges on the recipient, or has the effect of law.

Royal warrant may refer to:
 Royal warrant of appointment, warrant to tradespeople who supply goods or services to a royal court
 Royal warrant of appointment (Spain), issued to those who supplied goods or services to the King of Spain
 Royal warrant of appointment (Thailand), issued to companies and businesses that have shown exceptional services
 Royal warrant of appointment (United Kingdom), granted by senior members of the British royal family
 List of royal warrant holders of the British royal family
 List of royal warrant holders of the Swedish court, granted by the king or the queen
 Royal warrant of precedence, a warrant issued by the monarch of the United Kingdom to determine precedence amongst individuals or organisations
 Royal charter, a formal document issued by a monarch to establish an organization
 Warrant (law), a specific type of authorization
 Warrant officer, an officer in a military organisation designated an officer by a warrant

See also
 Letters patent, a type of legal instrument granting rights or privileges
 Royal commission, a major ad-hoc formal public inquiry into a defined issue in some monarchies, often established by royal warrant
 Royal sign-manual, a monarch's signature which confirms an order, commission, or warrant
 Warrant of appointment, the official document presented by the President of Ireland to persons upon appointment to certain high offices of state
 Warrant (disambiguation)